Xylophloeus is a genus of beetles in the family Laemophloeidae, containing the following species:

 Xylophloeus bimaculatus Lefkovitch
 Xylophloeus chrysomeloides Lefkovitch
 Xylophloeus darjeelingensis Mukhopadhyay & Sen Gupta
 Xylophloeus dentatus Lefkovitch
 Xylophloeus elgonensis Lefkovitch
 Xylophloeus integer Grouvelle
 Xylophloeus mimosae Lefkovitch
 Xylophloeus nainitalensis Mukhopadhyay & Sen Gupta
 Xylophloeus patens Grouvelle
 Xylophloeus unifasciatus Lefkovitch

References

Laemophloeidae
Cucujoidea genera